The Neighbor is a Spanish superhero comedy streaming television series, created by Miguel Esteban and Raúl Navarro based on the comic series El Vecino by Santiago García and Pepo Pérez. The series stars Quim Gutiérrez, Clara Lago, Adrián Pino and Catalina Sopelana. It premiered on Netflix on 31 December 2019. In February 2020, the series was renewed for a second and final season, which premiered on 21 May 2021.

Synopsis
 
The Neighbor follows the story of a hapless man, who one day inadvertently gains a mysterious power. With the help of his friendly neighbor, he begins to master his newfound abilities to fight evil and at the same time, conceal them from the public eye, including his suspicious ex-girlfriend.

Cast
 Quim Gutiérrez as Javier
 Clara Lago as Lola
 Adrián Pino as José Ramón
 Catalina Sopelana as Julia
 Jorge Sanz as Alienígena
 Sergio Momo as Rober
 Paula Malia as Alicia
 Denis Gómez as Camello
 Aníbal Gómez as Adolfo
 Nacho Marraco as Marcelo
 Aitziber Garmendia as Marta
 Fran Perea (season 2)
 Gracia Olayo (season 2)
 Javier Botet (season 2)
 Celia de Molina (season 2)

Episodes

Season 1 (2019)

Season 2 (2021)

Production

Development
On 6 February 2019, it was announced that Netflix had given the production a series order for a first season consisting of ten episodes. The series was created by Miguel Esteban and Raúl Navarro who are also credited as executive producers. Additional executive producers include Carlos de Pando and Sara Antuña. Production companies involved with the series include Zeta Audiovisual. The first season was released on 31 December 2019. On 20 February 2020, Netflix renewed the series for a second and final season, which premiered worldwide on 21 May 2021. For the second season, the series was directed by Ernesto Sevilla, Raúl Navarro, Víctor García León and Mar Olid and written by Raúl Navarro,  Miguel Esteban and Marc Crehuet. Additionally, Josep Gatell and Teresa de Rosendo join as showrunners, with Eneko Gutiérrez credited as an executive produced for the second season.

Casting
Sometime after the series was ordered by Netflix, it was confirmed that Quim Gutiérrez, Clara Lago, Adrián Pino and Catalina Sopelana would star in the series. On 29 May 2020, it was confirmed that Fran Perea, Gracia Olayo, Javier Botet, and Celia de Molina would join the cast for the second season.

Release

Premiere
On 15 November 2019, the series held its official premiere with the screening of the first two episodes at the Gijón International Film Festival in Gijón, Spain.

Marketing
On 15 November 2019, Netflix released the official trailer for the series. On 7 May 2021, Netflix released the official trailer for the second season.

References

External links

2019 Spanish television series debuts
2010s comedy-drama television series
Television shows based on comics
Superhero television series
Comedy-drama web series
Spanish-language Netflix original programming
2010s Spanish comedy television series
Television series by Zeta Studios